Vadym Lazorenko (born 1 March 1965 in Kiev) is a former Soviet footballer and Ukrainian football manager.

References

External links 
 
 Vadym Lazorenko. Luhansk Our Football portal.
 
 

1965 births
Living people
Footballers from Kyiv
Soviet footballers
Ukrainian football managers
FC Ros Bila Tserkva players
FC Nyva Ternopil players
FC VSS Košice players
FC Stal Kamianske managers
FC Slavutych managers
FC Systema-Boreks Borodianka managers
FC Obolon Kyiv managers
FC Borysfen Boryspil managers
FC Ros Bila Tserkva managers
FC Desna Chernihiv managers
FC Yednist Plysky managers
FC Ararat Yerevan managers
FC Lyubomyr Stavyshche managers
Ukrainian expatriate footballers
Expatriate footballers in Czechoslovakia
Association football defenders
Ukrainian expatriate football managers
Expatriate football managers in Armenia
Ukrainian expatriate sportspeople in Armenia
Ukrainian Second League managers